Cornelis de Graeff, also Cornelis de Graeff van (Zuid-)Polsbroek (15 October 1599 – 4 May 1664) was the most illustrious member of the De Graeff family. He was a mayor of Amsterdam from the Dutch Golden Age and a powerful Amsterdam regent after the sudden death of stadholder William II of Orange, during the First Stadtholderless Period. Like his father Jacob Dircksz de Graeff, he opposed the house of Orange, and was the moderate successor to the republican Andries Bicker. In the mid 17th century he controlled the city's finances and politics and, in close cooperation with his brother Andries de Graeff and their nephew Johan de Witt, the Netherlands political system.

Cornelis de Graeff followed in his father's footsteps and, between 1643 and 1664, was appointed mayor some ten times. De Graeff was a member of a family of regents who belonged to the republican political movement also referred to as the ‘state oriented’, as opposed to the Royalists.

Cornelis de Graeff was also the founder of a regent dynasty that retained power and influence for centuries and produced a number of ministers. He was Lord of the semisouverain Fief (allodiale hoge heerlijkheid) Zuidpolsbroek and an Ambachtsheer (Lord of the Manor) of Sloten, Sloterdijk, Nieuwer-Amstel, Osdorp and Amstelveen, near Amsterdam, and castlelord of Ilpenstein. De Graeff was also President of the Dutch East Indies Company, and a chiefcouncillor of the Admiralty of Amsterdam. Like his brother, Andries De Graeff, he was an art collector and patron of the arts.

During his life De Graeff was often called "Polsbroek" or "Lord Polsbroek".

Family De Graeff

Origin

Cornelis de Graeff was the oldest son of Jacob Dircksz de Graeff, mayor of Amsterdam and Vrijheer of Zuid-Polsbroek, and his wife Aeltje Boelens Loen, member of the family Boelens Loen, one of the oldest patrician families of Amsterdam. He grew up in the Niezel, a small street not far from the Oude Kerk. De Graeff was crippled for life in the left arm by a childhood accident, as can be seen in his painting. 

At twenty he went to Paris and in 1633 he married Geertruid Overlander (1609–1634), daughter of Volkert Overlander, whose stepson was Frans Banning Cocq, the captain in Rembrandt's Night Watch. She died only a few months later and he remarried with Catharina Hooft, nineteen years younger and his first wife's cousin (her mother was another Geertruid Overlander, 1577–1653, the sister of Catharinas father). She was the daughter of Pieter Jansz Hooft, and relative to Amsterdam mayor Cornelis Pietersz. Hooft and to the renowned P. C. Hooft of the Muiderslot. Her mother was Geertruid Overlander, daughter of Volkert Overlander. The couple De Graeff-Hooft had two children: Pieter de Graeff and Jacob de Graeff. The married couple inhabited a fine building with precious woodwork, not far from the city hall, at what is now Herengracht 216.

Cornelis de Graeff and his younger brother Andries de Graeff – who after Cornelis's death succeeded him as regent and mayor – busied themselves with art and genealogy, working on their lineage. Of his five brothers and sisters, four married a Bicker, who also originated from the Niezel.

Coat of arms
The coat of arms of Cornelis de Graeff is quartered with a heart shield and shows the following symbols:
 heart shield shows the three silver rhombuses on red (originally from the family Van Woerdern van Vliet) of the High Lordship Zuid-Polsbroek
 field 1 (left above) shows the silver shovel on red of their paternal ancestors, the Herren von Graben
 field 2 (right above) shows the silver swan on blue of the Fief Vredenhof [or that one (Waterland) of their maternal ancestors, the De Grebber]
 field 3 (left below), same as field 2
 field 4 (right below), same as field 1
 helmet covers in red and silver
 helm adornment shows an upright silver spade with ostrich feathers (Herren von Graben)
 motto: MORS SCEPTRA LIGONIBUS AEQUAT (DEATH MAKES SEPTRES AND HOES EQUAL)

Historical and political Legacy
 

Cornelis de Graeff said that the ancient Amsterdammers had no habit of keeping genealogical records of their families, and knew no more of their generation than what they have learned from their fathers and grandfathers. The dates of his own family in Amsterdam do not go back very far:

And first I'll start with the family de Graven from which I descended on my father's side. This is a family from Amsterdam, coming from the house 'de Keijser', that was located at the Waeter (= now Damrak No. 91). This house shows the impression of its vaulted appearance, owned by Jan Pieters de Graeff, and then by Dirck Jans de Graeff, who also sold this house. My father Jacob de Graeff and his brothers were also born here.

The De Graeff family has therefore never boasted about the age of their own family in Amsterdam. But Cornelis and his brother Andries together with their cousins Andries and Cornelis Bicker, saw themselves as the political heirs of the old regent family Boelens, whose main lineage, which had remained catholic, had died out in the male line in 1647. They had received the very significant first names Andries and Cornelis from their Boelens ancestors. As in a real dynasty, members of the two families frequently intermarried in the 17th century in order to keep their political and commercial capital together. Its great historical ancestor was Andries Boelens (1455-1519), the city's most influential medieval mayor. Both families, Bicker and De Graeff, descend in the female line from Boelens. He was allowed to hold the highest office in Amsterdam fifteen times.

Influence

Both brothers Cornelis and Andries de Graeff were very critical of the Orange family’s influence. Together with the Republican political leader Grand Pensionary Johan de Witt, the De Graeff brothers strived for the abolition of stadtholdership. They desired the full sovereignty of the individual regions in a form in which the Republic of the United Seven Netherlands was not ruled by a single person. Instead of a sovereign (or stadtholder) the political and military power was lodged with the States General and with the regents of the cities in Holland.

During the two decades the De Graeff family had a leading role in the Amsterdam administration, the city was at the peak of its political power. This period was also referred to by Republicans as the ‘Ware Vrijheid’ (True Freedom). It was the First Stadtholderless Period which lasted from 1650 to 1672. During these twenty years, the regents from Holland and in particular those of Amsterdam, controlled the republic. The city was flush with self-confidence and liked to compare itself to the famous Republic of Rome. Even without a stadtholder, things seemed to be going well for the Republic and its regents both politically and economically.

As the first Statesman of Amsterdam and Holland

Cornelis was a merchant and administrator of the VOC, and from 1639 a member of the vroedschap and in 1643–1662 mayor ten times (by turn as magnificus, or chairing mayor with the deciding vote) in the difficult times of the First Stadtholderless Period.

He began as a captain at the schutterij, and it was his company that was painted in 1642 by Jacob Adriaenszoon Backer (to be seen in the Rijkmuseum Amsterdam). In 1645 Cornelis became an advisor of the States of Holland and West Friesland. In 1648 De Graeff was one of the main figures behind the building of a new city hall on the Dam, that was inaugurated in 1655. In the failed attack on Amsterdam in 1650, De Graeff realised that Andries, Cornelis and the other Bickers had to leave the vroedschap. De Graeff was one of the prime movers behind the Peace of Münster in 1648 and the Act of Seclusion in 1654, in which William III was excluded from the office of Stadtholder. He reached the height of his power as chairing mayor of Amsterdam, together with Johan Huydecoper van Maarsseveen. Cornelis de Graeff was brilliant not only in living languages, but also in Greek, Hebrew, Syriac and Arabic. He never went to church, but only for political reasons. It was probably due to his influence that Nieuwe Kerk was built without a tower. He was the patron of Vondel and Jan Vos and commissioned eight paintings from Govert Flinck for the city hall.

De Graeff and Johan de Witt: The true Freedom
Politically important as well as personally satisfying was De Graeff's ties with his niece Wendela Bicker's husband Johan de Witt. De Witt eagerly sought De Graeff's advice and support and also enjoyed his clearness of mind and warm hospitality. Their relationship combined the closeness of family affection and the mutual respect of two strong minds as De Graeff was De Witt's equal as no one else was in Dutch politics at the time. In 1653 De Graeff made Johan de Witt a 'Grand Pensionary', a sort of chairman, of the States of Holland.

War between Sweden and Poland
Amsterdam and De Graeff were at the high point of their power and in 1656 mounted an expedition under Michiel de Ruyter to the Mediterranean Sea and - in Charles X Gustav of Sweden's war against Poland - another under Jacob van Wassenaer Obdam to the Baltic Sea. Fortunately for the Netherlands, this war ended in Danzig being declared neutral. The four strong-headed mayors decided to send Coenraad van Beuningen to Copenhagen to incite Denmark into a war against Sweden. To everyone's amazement, in the middle of the winter the Swedish king crossed over from Jutland, across the Great Belt, to Copenhagen. In a second expedition to relieve Copenhagen, Witte de With participated in the Battle of the Sound. Cornelis de Graeff was prepared to begin the fight against Sweden, against the advice of the Grand Pensionarys. When Charles X unexpectedly died in 1660, Sweden made peace. Amsterdam sent also admiral Michiel de Ruyter against the English, against the orders of the parliament of the Netherlands. Despite these differences in approach with De Witt, he and De Graeff stayed on good terms. De Witt in 1660 observed of Cornelis: "with the gentleman of Zuidpolsbroek, in nothing was to do something".

William III of Orange

In 1657, De Graeff and De Witt mediated the "Treaty of Raalte", in which William III of Orange passed the stadholdership of Overijssel.

On 25 September 1660 the States of Holland under the prime movers of De Witt, De Graeff, his younger brother Andries de Graeff and Gillis Valckenier resolved to take charge of Willem III of Oranges education to ensure he would acquire the skills to serve in a future—though undetermined—state function. During the summers the family spent a lot of their time at the Palace Soestdijk, and the sons of De Graeff played with the young William - who became later King of England, Scotland and Ireland and stadtholder of the United Provinces of the Netherlands - at the lake and woods at Palace Soestdijk. After the rampjaar his son Jacob sold it to stadholder William III.

The Dutch Gift
In 1660 the Dutch Gift was organized by the regents, especially the powerful brothers Cornelis and Andries de Graeff. The sculptures for the gift were selected by the pre-eminent sculptor in the Netherlands, Artus Quellinus, and Gerrit van Uylenburgh, the son of Rembrandt's dealer Hendrick van Uylenburgh, advised the States-General on the purchase. The Dutch Gift was a collection of 28 mostly Italian Renaissance paintings and 12 classical sculptures, along with a yacht, the Mary, and furniture, which was presented to King Charles II of England by the States-General of the Netherlands in 1660.

Most of the paintings and all the Roman sculptures were from the Reynst collection, the most important seventeenth-century Dutch collection of paintings of the Italian sixteenth century, formed in Venice by Jan Reynst (1601–1646) and extended by his brother, Gerrit Reynst (1599–1658). The gift reflected the taste Charles II shared with his father, Charles I, whose large collection, one of the most magnificent in Europe, had mostly been sold abroad after he was executed in 1649. The collection was given to him to mark his return to power in the English Restoration, before which Charles had spent many years in exile in the Dutch Republic during the rule of the English Commonwealth. It was intended to strengthen diplomatic relations between England and the Republic, but only a few years after the gift the two nations would be at war again in the Second Anglo-Dutch War of 1665–1667.

Death
Cornelis's tomb chapel is to be found of in the Oude Kerk, and after his death his younger brother Andries and the cunning Gillis Valckenier took over his role on the council. After De Graeff's death Johan de Witt lost his power and reputation in Amsterdam and afterwards in the Province Holland.

Obituary and legacy

Historiography

De Graeff communicated in a soft and exemplary way and was honest and open, a novelty for the young republic, and felt that it was De Witt who had brought Amsterdam and its interests to their present good fortune. Also De Graeff never drove Amsterdam's affairs onto the rocks, but had a good eye for the interests of the other towns of Holland and avoided a mode of power-politics that would have left Amsterdam isolated.

Aims
Hajo Brugmans states that De Graeff's aims were nearly always administrative and political - the power of Amsterdam in Holland, and the power of the Republic, was only as great as their social power, including the limitation of the power of the House of Orange. One point, however, is emphasised by Brugmans - that only De Graeff (out of all Amsterdam's politicians) was ever elected grand pensionary and then entirely successful in pleasing Amsterdam. The regent's descendant Adriaen Pauw was also elected as such in 1651.

Notes

Literature
 Israel, Jonathan I. (1995) The Dutch Republic - Its Rise, Greatness, and Fall - 1477-1806, Clarendon Press, Oxford, 
 Rowen, Herbert H. (1986) John de Witt - Statesman of the „True Freedom“, Cambridge University Press, 
 Kernkamp, G.W. (1977) Prins Willem II 1626-1650, p. 107-110.
 Dudok van Heel, S.A.C.(1995) Op zoek naar Romulus & Remus. Een zeventiende-eeuws onderzoek naar de oudste magistraten van Amsterdam. Jaarboek Amstelodamum, p. 43-70.
 Zandvliet, Kees De 250 rijksten van de Gouden Eeuw - Kapitaal, macht, familie en levensstijl (2006 Amsterdam; Nieuw Amsterdam Uitgevers)
 Burke, P. (1994) Venice and Amsterdam. A study of seventeenth-century élites.
 Brugmans, Hajo (1973) Geschiedenis van Amsterdam - Deel 3 Bloeitijd, 1621–1697, p. 159 t/m 167, (Het Spectrum, Utrecht) 
 Graeff, P. de (P. de Graeff Gerritsz en Dirk de Graeff van Polsbroek) Genealogie van de familie De Graeff van Polsbroek, Amsterdam 1882.
 Bruijn, J. H. de Genealogie van het geslacht De Graeff van Polsbroek 1529/1827, met bijlagen. De Built 1962-63.
 Moelker, H.P. De heerlijkheid Purmerland en Ilpendam (1978 Purmerend)

External links and Commons

 Biografie from Cornelis de Graeff at the Nieuw Nederlandsch biografisch woordenboek. Deel 2 (nl)
 Biografie from Cornelis de Graeff at the Nieuw Nederlandsch biografisch woordenboek. Deel 7 (nl)
 Triumpf of Peace
 Portrait of Cornelis de Graeff by Nicolaes Eliasz. Pickenoy in the Gemäldegalerie, Berlin
 Medaillons of Cornelis de Graeff, his wife and his brother Andries in the Rijksmuseum
 Poem on him by Vondel
 History of Herengracht 573, now the Handbagmuseum

1599 births
1664 deaths
Dutch States Party politicians
Nobility from Amsterdam
Cornelis, Graeff de
Mayors of Amsterdam
17th-century Dutch politicians
Lords of Zuid-Polsbroek
Lords of Sloten
Lords of Amstelveen
Administrators of the Dutch East India Company
Burials at the Oude Kerk, Amsterdam
Jacob van Ruisdael